Bush Radio may refer to:
 Bush Radio (South Africa), a Cape Town radio station
 Bush (brand), a British electronics manufacturer formerly known as "Bush Radio"